Prisca Awiti Alcaraz (born 20 February 1996) is a judoka. Born in England, she represents Mexico internationally.

An alumna of the  University of Bath and a member of the Team Bath Sports Training Village she battled back from a shoulder injury to win the silver medal at the Panamerican Senior Championships in Guadalajara in April 2021. She was selected to compete at the 2020 Summer Games and was drawn against Boldyn Gankhaich in the opening round.

References

External links
 
 
 

1996 births
Living people
Sportspeople from London
Citizens of Mexico through descent
English female judoka
Mexican female judoka
Alumni of the University of Bath
Olympic judoka of Mexico
Judoka at the 2020 Summer Olympics
Black British sportswomen
English people of Kenyan descent
English sportspeople of African descent
English people of Mexican descent
Sportspeople of Mexican descent
Mexican people of Kenyan descent